The Theban Tomb TT83 is located in Sheikh Abd el-Qurna, part of the Theban Necropolis, on the west bank of the Nile, opposite to Luxor. It is the burial place of the ancient Egyptian official, Amethu called Ahmose, who was the Governor of the town and Vizier. Amethu called Ahmose dates to the Eighteenth Dynasty of Egypt, from the time of Tuthmosis III. 

The tomb was known in the 19th century when the Egyptologist Sir John Gardiner Wilkinson lived in the tomb in the 1820s.

Family
Amethu called Ahmose and his wife Ta-Amethu were the parents of the Vizier Useramen (TT131) and Neferweben and the grandparents of the Vizier Rekhmire (TT100).

Tomb
The tomb consists of a portico and an inner room. The ceiling of the portico show remains of the titles of the deceased. The inner room contains scenes depicting rites before the mummy and provide the name and titles of Useramen.

See also
 List of Theban tombs

References

Buildings and structures completed in the 13th century BC
Theban tombs
Buildings and structures of the Eighteenth Dynasty of Egypt